"I Fell in Love Again Last Night" is a song written by Paul Overstreet and Thom Schuyler, and recorded by American country music group The Forester Sisters.  It was released in June 1985 as the second single from the album The Forester Sisters.  The song was The Forester Sisters' second country hit and the first of five number ones on the country chart.  The single went to number one for one week and spent a total of fourteen weeks within the Top 40.

Charts

Weekly charts

Year-end charts

References

1985 singles
1985 songs
The Forester Sisters songs
Songs written by Paul Overstreet
Songs written by Thom Schuyler
Warner Records singles